The Turkish Blind Sports Federation (GESF) is the governing body to encourage and develop the sport for the blind and vision-impaired in Turkey. It is a member of the International Blind Sports Association (IBSA) and the International Paralympic Committee (IPC).

In 1990, the Turkish Disabled Sports Federation was formed, and the Blind Sport Federation was created as part of this organization in Ankara. On March 7, 2000, the Blind Sport Federation separated as an independent organization. In accordance with the developments on blind sport in Europe, the Federation was officially established on July 12, 2000.

Sports promoted by the federation are:
athletics,
chess,
futsal B1 and B2/B3,
goalball women's and men's leagues,
judo,
cycling,
powerlifting as well as
swimming women's and men's short and long course.

International events hosted by Turkey
The federation organized the 4th IBSA World Championships and Games in Antalya on April 1–10, 2011.

Notable sportspeople
 Nazan Akın (born 1983), 2012 Summer Paralympics silver medalist in judoka
 Duygu Çete (born 1989), 2012 Summer Paralympics bronze medalist in judoka

See also
 Turkey men's national goalball team

References

External links
 Türkiye Görme Engelliler Spor Federasyonu official site (Turkish)

Blind
Federation|Turkey
Blindness organizations in Turkey
Blind sports
Organizations based in Ankara
Sports organizations established in 2000
2000 establishments in Turkey